This is a list of market towns that are now within the current area of Greater London. That is, a settlement where the municipal corporation has a market right, received from the monarch. Dates indicate the earliest known charters. The use of the market rights has lapsed in some towns and in some cases the use of the right was later revived.

See also
List of markets in London
Market (place)

References

External links
 Gazetteer of Markets and Fairs in England and Wales to 1516

 
Market towns in London
Market towns